"Peaches" is a song by American alternative rock band the Presidents of the United States of America. It was included on their self-titled debut album and released as a single in February 1996. The track was produced by American producer Conrad Uno. The band members have acknowledged that "Peaches" borrows riffs from Bad Company's 1975 song "Feel Like Makin' Love".

The song was released worldwide as the third single from The Presidents of the United States of America. It peaked at number 29 on the US Billboard Hot 100 and number eight on the Billboard Modern Rock Tracks chart. Worldwide, the song reached number one in Iceland and the top 20 in Australia, Canada, Ireland, New Zealand, and the United Kingdom. It received a gold certification in Australia for shipments of over 35,000 units. In 1996, "Peaches" was nominated for a Grammy Award for Best Pop Performance by a Duo or Group with Vocal.

Composition
In an interview with American Songwriter magazine, the lead singer of Presidents of the United States of America, Chris Ballew, explained that the song was inspired by two separate incidents: The first, which took place in Boston, involved Ballew taking LSD and going to the house of a woman he was attracted to. After knocking on her door and not receiving an answer, Ballew decided to wait for her underneath a nearby peach tree. According to Ballew, "There were peaches that had fallen, that were in various stages of decay. And ... I just started ... squeezing the peaches and mixing it with my desire for the girl and the desire for the peaches". The second incident occurred later when Ballew had moved back to Seattle. While waiting for a bus, he overheard a homeless man repeatedly mutter under his breath, "I'm moving to the country, I'm gonna eat a lot of peaches." The phrase stuck with Ballew, and after connecting it to his experience in Boston, he began to develop the lyrics for what would become "Peaches".

Ballew said he was emulating Nirvana in the verses by trying to sound "gnarly and growly".

Music video
The music video features the band performing the song in an orchard filled with trees growing peach cans. During the song's instrumental break, the band is attacked by a group of ninjas attempting to capture them. They fight the ninjas for the remainder of the video and eventually defeat them.

For years, the video was only available in low quality online. On February 28, 2023, the video was remastered in HD and uploaded to YouTube.

Formats and track listings

US 7-inch single
A. "Peaches"
B. "Video Killed the Radio Star"

US maxi-CD single
 "Peaches" – 2:49
 "Candy Cigarette" – 2:00
 "Carolyn's Bootie" – 2:15
 "Confusion" – 2:45
 "Wake Up" – 2:37

US cassette single
A. "Peaches" – 2:49
B. "Candy Cigarette" – 2:00

UK CD single
 "Peaches" – 2:49
 "Feather Pluckn" (live) – 3:17
 "Boll Weevil" (live) – 3:14
 "Dune Buggy" (live) – 2:43

UK 7-inch picture disc single
A. "Peaches" – 2:49
B. "Confusion" – 2:43

Australian CD single
 "Peaches" – 2:49
 "Wake Up" – 2:40
 "Monkey River" – 4:05

Charts

Weekly charts

Year-end charts

Certifications

References

External links
 

1995 songs
1996 singles
Columbia Records singles
Number-one singles in Iceland
The Presidents of the United States of America (band) songs
Songs written by Chris Ballew